Behler may refer to:

Behler, West Virginia, an unincorporated community in Monongalia County
Behler See, a lake in Germany

People
Chuck Behler
Ernst Behler
John L. Behler
Klemens Behler